Jaromír Plocek (born 14 December 1974) is a Czech former football player. He played in the top flight of his country, making more than 200 appearances in the Gambrinus liga.

References

External links
 
 
 Profile at SK Dynamo České Budějovice website

1974 births
Living people
Czech footballers
Czech Republic under-21 international footballers
Czech First League players
Slovak Super Liga players
FC Viktoria Plzeň players
AFK Atlantic Lázně Bohdaneč players
FK Viktoria Žižkov players
SK Dynamo České Budějovice players
MŠK Žilina players
Association football midfielders